The 2004 United States Olympic trials for track and field were held at Hornet Stadium in Sacramento, California. Organised by USA Track and Field, the ten-day competition lasted from July 9 until July 18 and served as the national championships in track and field for the United States.

The results of the event determined qualification for the American Olympic team at the 2004 Summer Olympics, held in Athens. Provided they had achieved the Olympic "A" standard, the top three athletes gained a place on the Olympic team. In the event that a leading athlete did not hold an "A" standard, or an athlete withdrew, the next highest finishing athlete with an "A" standard was selected instead.

The trials for the men's marathon were held February 7 in Birmingham, Alabama, the women's marathon were held April 23 in St. Louis and the trials for the men's 50 km race walk were held February 15 in Chula Vista, California.

Medal summary
Key:
.

Men

Men track events

Men field events

Notes
 As winner Meb Keflezighi chose not to compete in the 10,000 metres event at the Olympics, 22nd placed Dathan Ritzenhein, who had the "A" standard of 27:49.00 from a previous race, was included in the Olympic team.

Women

Women track events

Women field events

Notes
 Deena Kastor chose to focus on the marathon and so was not entered in the 10,000 metres in Athens.
 Women's 3000 metre steeplechase was not an event at the 2004 Summer Olympics.
 As third placed Akiba McKinney did not have the "A" standard of 6.70 m, fourth placed Rose Richmond was included in her the Olympic team
 Shakeema Walker and Vanitta Kinard did not have the "A" standard of 14.20 m, so sixth placed Yuliana Perez was included.
 As third placed Amber Campbell did not have the "A" standard of 67.50 m, fourth placed Jackie Jeschelnig was included in the team.

References

Results
Full Results . USATF. Retrieved on 2015-09-06.

External links
Official webpage  at USATF

USA Outdoor Track and Field Championships
US Olympic Trials
Track, Outdoor
United States Summer Olympics Trials
United States Olympic Trials (track and field)
Track and field in California